All a Man Should Do is the 9th studio album by the alt.country/rock group Lucero. It was recorded at Ardent Studios in Memphis, TN and released 18 September 2015 on ATO Records.

Track listing

Reviews and reception
The release has received positive reviews from publications such as American Songwriter.

Charts

References

2015 albums
Lucero (band) albums
ATO Records albums